The Diocese of Tulcea is a diocese of the Romanian Orthodox Church. Its see is Saint Nicholas Cathedral in Tulcea and its ecclesiastical territory covers Tulcea County. Divided into three archpriests' districts, it has around 150 churches and priests, fourteen monasteries and a theological seminary in Tulcea. The diocese forms part of the Metropolis of Muntenia and Dobrudja. It was established in 2004, and in 2008, Visarion Bălțat became the diocese's first bishop.

Notes

External links
 Official site

Tulcea
2004 establishments in Romania
Tulcea
Tulcea County